Albelda de Iregua is a village and municipality in the province and autonomous community of La Rioja, Spain.

Geography

Albelda is located south of Logroño in the lower Iregua valley. This provides a fertile land for growing fruit.

The village is bounded on the north by Lardero and Alberite, to the east by Clavijo, to the south by Nalda and to the west by Sorzano and Entrena.

Within its terrains were the unpopulated communities of Longares, depopulated in the 12th century, Morcuera, deserted in the 14th century and Mucrones.

History
In 1063 the Bishop of Nájera approved a Town Charter for the population, under the name Longares.

The town had a Jewish community since the 10th century till the Spanish Jewish Inquisition in 1492. During that period of time, about 35 families lived in the town, paying taxes to the local bishop. Several Jews acquired the surname of the town, such as Moses Albelda (died 1545), a bible commentator who lived in Turkey and assumed to have ancestors from the town, who escaped to Turkey during the Inquisition.

Toponym
Its name may come from the Arabic term with the article Bayda Al, which means 'The White'. On the other hand, the etymology of the word "Albelda" proposed by the historian Urbano Espinosa points to the toponym Albalda/Albeilda (in Spanish), meaning "the village", as recorded in the Christian chronicles and consolidated during the Muslim rule (8th and 9th centuries). Its meaning has to do with the set of three monasteries located in the townships of Nalda and Albelda: San Pantaleon (in Nalda), and the monasteries of Albelda and Las Tapias, in Albelda itself.

Population
As at 1 January 2010 the population of Albelda de Iregua was 3,291 persons, 1727 men and 1564 women.

Places of interest

Buildings and monuments
 San Martín Church, constructed in 1970
 Santa Isabel Hermitage
 Nuestra Señora de Bueyo Hermitage, Romanesque. It was declared Bien de Interés Cultural (property of Cultural Interest) in the category of monuments on 13 June 1983.
Santa Fe de Palazuelos Hermitage. It was declared Bien de Interés Cultural (property of Cultural Interest) in the category of monuments on 25 October 1984.

Photo gallery

Local celebrations
 Pilgrimage to San Marcos: 25 April
 Saint Prudencio Feast day: 28 April
 Feasts of Triumph (or Summer): last Sunday in August
 Isidore the Laborer: 15 May
 Saint James: 25 July
 Virgen de Bueyo: 25 March

Notable people
 Javier Cámara, actor
 Salva Díez, basketball player
 Carlos Coloma Nicolás, cyclist

See also
 San Martín de Albelda monastery
 Battle of Albelda (851)

References

External links
 Photos of Albelda

Populated places in La Rioja (Spain)
Bien de Interés Cultural landmarks in La Rioja (Spain)